Steve Thompson (born December 22, 1950) is an American politician. He is a member of the Georgia State Senate from the 33rd District, serving from 1991 to 2015. He is a member of the Democratic party. He also served in the Georgia State House of Representatives from 1981 to 1991.

References

Living people
Democratic Party Georgia (U.S. state) state senators
1950 births
Democratic Party members of the Georgia House of Representatives
Politicians from Atlanta
21st-century American politicians